Dennis Heywood  (born April 1852) was a Welsh international footballer. He was part of the Wales national football team, playing 1 match on 18 January 1879 against England.

See also
 List of Wales international footballers (alphabetical)
 List of Wales international footballers born outside Wales

References

1852 births
Welsh footballers
Wales international footballers

Association football wingers
1936 deaths